Chloroclystis rufofasciata is a moth in the family Geometridae. It is found in New Guinea.

Adults are entirely silvery ash-grey with patches of scattered black scales on the fore- and hindwings.

References

External links

Moths described in 1913
rufofasciata